= Inzapur =

Village in Wardha district, Maharashtra, India

Coordinates: 20.5512399°N 78.558955°E

Inzapur village is located in Wardha tehsil of Wardha district in Maharashtra. inzapur is also a gram panchayat. It is situated 4 km away from district headquarter Wardha and 4 km away from sub-district headquarter Wardha. the total population of the village is 2110, there are 551 households in the village and Wardha is the nearest town to the village.
